S-Files is a Philippine television talk show broadcast by GMA Network. Originally hosted by Paolo Bediones and Lyn Ching, it premiered on June 7, 1998 replacing ETChing: Entertainment Today with Lyn Ching. The show concluded on April 22, 2007 with a total of 464 episodes. Pia Guanio, Richard Gomez, Joey Marquez and John Lapus served as the final hosts. It was replaced by Showbiz Central in its timeslot.

Hosts

 Paolo Bediones 
 Lyn Ching-Pascual 
 Janice de Belen 
 Toni Gonzaga 
 Pia Guanio 
 Richard Gomez 
 Joey Marquez 
 John Lapus 
 Princess Violago

Accolades

References

External links
 

1998 Philippine television series debuts
2007 Philippine television series endings
Entertainment news shows in the Philippines
Filipino-language television shows
GMA Network original programming
Philippine television talk shows